Henry Hoffman may refer to:

 Henry William Hoffman (1825–1895), U.S. Representative from Maryland
 Henry W. Hoffman (1868–1963), politician from Wisconsin